The 2017–18 Curaçao Sekshon Pagá is the 92nd season of top-flight association football in Curaçao, and the 41st season of the competition being branded as the Sekshon Pagá. The regular season started on 5 November 2017, and the final was played on 8 July 2018.

Regular season

Kaya 6

Kaya 4

Final

References

2017-18
1
2017–18 in Caribbean football leagues